William Barner Lienhard (January 14, 1930 – February 8, 2022) was an American basketball player who competed in the 1952 Summer Olympics.

Lienhard was born in Slaton, Texas.  He went to college at the University of Kansas, where he was a member of the 1952 NCAA Champion basketball team.  He was then part of the American Olympic basketball team, which won the gold medal. He played a total of five matches during the Summer Games in Helsinki.  After the Olympics, he joined the Air Force, where he continued to play basketball.  Upon leaving the Air Force, he retired from the sport and lived as a banker in Kansas. Lienhard died on February 8, 2022, at the age of 92.

References

External links
 
 
 

1930 births
2022 deaths
American men's basketball players
Basketball players at the 1952 Summer Olympics
Basketball players from Texas
Military personnel from Texas
Kansas Jayhawks men's basketball players
Medalists at the 1952 Summer Olympics
Olympic gold medalists for the United States in basketball
People from Slaton, Texas
Sportspeople from Lawrence, Kansas
United States men's national basketball team players